Prathinidhi is a 2014 Indian Telugu-language political thriller film produced by J Samba Siva Rao under Sudha cinemas. It was directed by debutant Prashanth Mandava. The film stars Nara Rohit and Shubra Aiyappa in the lead roles. Music is composed by Sai Karthik. The film received positive reviews from critics and the audience. This film was remade in Tamil as Ko 2.

Shooting launched on 26 June 2013 at Hyderabad. It was dubbed in Hindi as a Pratinidhi Ek Leader.

Plot
In the starting scene, a mysterious figure who calls himself "the common man" kidnaps Sambasiva Rao (Kota Srinivasa Rao), the Chief Minister of Andhra Pradesh, in a private old age home event in Hyderabad. The news goes viral, and everyone the from local to the cabinet starts taking the issue personally. The Home Minister appoints Police Commissioner Anjanaprasad (Posani Krishna Murali) to rescue the CM. He gets hold of Srikar (Sree Vishnu), who helped him kidnap the CM. Srikar explains how he met Manchodu Srinu (Nara Rohit) and Sunaina to the PC. As cops strive to get clues about the kidnapper, Seenu comes out with wacky yet valid demands that mostly deal with Indian currency and economy. The rest of story is about the background of Seenu and why he has kidnapped Sambasiva Rao.

Cast
 Nara Rohit as Manchodu Sreenu aka Common Man
 Shubra Aiyappa as Sunaina
 Sree Vishnu as Srikar
 Kota Srinivasa Rao as Chief Minister Sambasiva Rao
 Jaya Prakash Reddy as Home Minister
 Ranganath as DGP Ranganath
 Posani Krishna Murali as Police Commissioner Anjanaprasad
 Ravi Prakash as Assistant Commissioner Ravi Prakash
 Giribabu as textile minister and father of Srikar
 Laxman Meesala

Soundtrack

The Soundtrack was composed by Sai Karthik and Released by Aditya Music.

Critical reception
Prathinidhi received favorable reviews from audience and critics. Idlebrain rated it 3.25/5, The Times of India rated it 3.5/5, and Greatandhra rated it 2.75/5.

References

External links

Telugu films remade in other languages
2010s Telugu-language films
Films scored by Sai Karthik
2014 films
2014 thriller films
Indian political thriller films
Films shot in Hyderabad, India
Films set in Hyderabad, India